Ekanayake Mudiyanselage Nawodya Imesh Wijayakumara (born 26 March 2000) is a Sri Lankan cricketer. He made his first-class debut on 14 February 2020, for Sebastianites Cricket and Athletic Club in the 2019–20 Premier League Tournament Tier B. He made his List A debut on 3 April 2021, for Ace Capital Cricket Club in the 2020–21 Major Clubs Limited Over Tournament.

References

External links
 

2000 births
Living people
Sri Lankan cricketers
Sebastianites Cricket and Athletic Club cricketers
Sri Lanka Ports Authority Cricket Club cricketers
Place of birth missing (living people)